The São Francisco River is a river of Rondônia state in western Brazil. It is a tributary of the Jaci Paraná River.

See also
List of rivers of Rondônia

References
Brazilian Ministry of Transport

Rivers of Rondônia